Janice Andrew  (born 25 November 1943), also known by her married name Janice Thornett, is an Australian butterfly swimmer of the 1950s, who won a bronze medal in the 100-metre butterfly and a silver medal in the 4×100-metre medley relay at the 1960 Summer Olympics.

Arriving at the 1960 Olympics in Rome, Andrew had been regarded as a medal contender in the 100-metre butterfly.  She was in the spotlight when during a team meeting, Australian team officials had ordered Dawn Fraser to swim the butterfly leg in the 4×100-metre medley relay preliminaries in her place, as she was ordered to rest ahead of her individual event later that night.  Fraser refused, hitting Andrew with a pillow.  It was only when Alva Colquhoun volunteered that the dispute was resolved.  In the 100-metre event that night, Andrew claimed bronze behind Carolyn Schuler of the United States and Marianne Heemskerk of the Netherlands.  She later combined with Fraser, Rosemary Lassig and Marilyn Wilson to register a silver medal in the 4×100-metre medley relay, trailing the Americans home by 5 seconds.

See also
 List of Olympic medalists in swimming (women)
 World record progression 100 metres butterfly

References 
 
 

1943 births
Living people
Australian female butterfly swimmers
World record setters in swimming
Olympic bronze medalists in swimming
Olympic swimmers of Australia
Swimmers at the 1960 Summer Olympics
Medalists at the 1960 Summer Olympics
Olympic silver medalists for Australia
Olympic bronze medalists for Australia